The Leinster Ladies' senior football club championship has been running since 1978. The trophy is named after the man who presented it, Bill Daly, a Cavanman who lived in Dublin and was involved with Ballyboden St Endas. Kilmacud Crokes are the current holders having secured their first ever title in November 2022 and represented Leinster in the All Ireland series.

Foxrock-Cabinteely are the only club to win six consecutive Leinster senior titles.

Laois are the most successful county, having won it on 14 occasions. In total, six of the 12 Leinster counties have won the cup at least once - Laois, Dublin, Westmeath, Wexford, Offaly and Meath.

Key

By year

{| class="wikitable sortable"
|-
! Year !! Venue !! Winner !! Score !! Runner-up !! Score
|-
| 2022 || Bray || Kilmacud Crokes (Dublin) ||  || Tinahely (Wicklow) || 
|-
| 2021 || Kinnegad || Dunboyne (Meath) ||  || Foxrock–Cabinteely (Dublin) || 
|-
| 2020 || Kinnegad || Foxrock–Cabinteely (Dublin) ||  || Portlaoise (Laois) || 
|-
| 2019 || Kinnegad || Foxrock–Cabinteely (Dublin) ||  || Sarsfields (Laois) || 
|-
| 2018 || Kinnegad || style="background-color:#C0C0C0"| Foxrock–Cabinteely (Dublin) ||  || Sarsfields (Laois) || 
|-
| 2017 || Kinnegad || Foxrock–Cabinteely (Dublin) ||  || Confey (Kildare) || 
|-
| 2016 || Kinnegad || style="background-color:#C0C0C0"| Foxrock–Cabinteely (Dublin) ||  || St Laurence's (Kildare) || 
|-
| 2015 || Clane || Foxrock–Cabinteely (Dublin) ||  || Sarsfields (Laois) || 
|-
| 2014 || Clane  || Sarsfields (Laois) ||  || Na Fianna (Dublin) || 
|-
| 2013 || Clane || Sarsfields (Laois) ||  || Seneschalstown (Meath) || 
|-
| 2012 ||Aughrim  || Shelmaliers (Wexford)|| || Foxrock–Cabinteely (Dublin)|| 
|-
| 2011 ||St Conleth's Park|| style="background-color:#C0C0C0"| Na Fianna (Dublin) ||  || Sarsfields (Laois) || 
|-
| 2010 || Clane || Timahoe (Laois) ||  || Ballyboden St Endas (Dublin) || 
|-
| 2009 ||Athy || Timahoe (Laois) ||  || Seneschalstown (Meath) || 
|-
| 2008  || Graiguecullen || Sarsfields (Laois) ||  || Clonee (Wexford) ||
|-
| 2007 ||Athy || Ballyboden St Endas (Dublin) ||  || Timahoe (Laois) ||
|-
| 2006  ||Clane || Ballyboden St Endas (Dublin) ||  || Seneschalstown (Meath) ||
|-
| 2005 ||Athy || style="background-color:#FFD700"| Ballyboden St Endas (Dublin) ||  || Timahoe (Laois) || 
|-
| 2004 || O'Moore Park || style="background-color:#FFD700"| Ballyboden St Endas (Dublin) ||  || Clonee (Wexford) || 
|-
| 2003 ||Portarlington || style="background-color:#C0C0C0"| Seneschalstown (Meath)  ||  || Shelmaliers (Wexford)  || 
|-
| 2002  || Bagenalstown || Ballyboden St Endas (Dublin) ||  || Shelmaliers (Wexford) || 
|-
| 2001 || Clane|| style="background-color:#C0C0C0"| Ballyboden St Endas (Dublin)  ||  || Cooley Kickhams (Louth) ||
|-
| 2000  || St Mary's, Leixlip|| style="background-color:#C0C0C0"| Timahoe (Laois) ||  || Seneschalstown (Meath) || 
|-
| 1999  || Bagenalstown|| style="background-color:#FFD700"| Shelmaliers (Wexford) ||  || Timahoe (Laois) || 
|-
| 1998  || Bagenalstown|| style="background-color:#C0C0C0"| Portobello (Dublin)  ||  || Timahoe (Laois) || 
|-
| 1997 || Éire Óg, Carlow || style="background-color:#C0C0C0"| Shelmaliers (Wexford)  ||  || Crettyard (Laois) || 
|-
| 1996  ||Croke Park || style="background-color:#FFD700"| Shelmaliers (Wexford) ||  || Rochfortbridge (Westmeath)|| 
|-
| 1995 ||Tullow || Shelmaliers (Wexford) ||  || An Tóchar (Wicklow)|| 
|-
| 1994 ||Crettyard || style="background-color:#C0C0C0"| Rochfortbridge (Westmeath)  ||  || An Tóchar (Wicklow) || 
|-
| 1993 ||Crettyard || style="background-color:#C0C0C0"| Crettyard (Laois) ||  || Shelmaliers (Wexford) || 
|-
| 1992  ||Kinnegad || style="background-color:#C0C0C0"| Rochfortbridge (Westmeath)  ||  || Shelmaliers (Wexford) || 
|-
| 1991 ||O'Toole Park || style="background-color:#C0C0C0"| Rochfortbridge (Westmeath)  ||  || Robert Emmets (Dublin) || 
|-
| 1990 ||Adamstown || Rochfortbridge (Westmeath) ||  || Adamstown (Wexford) || 
|-
| rowspan="2"|1989  ||Rochfortbridge || style="background-color:#C0C0C0"| Rochfortbridge (Westmeath)  ||  || The Heath (Laois) || 
|-
| The Heath || Rochfortbridge (Westmeath) ||  || The Heath (Laois) || 
|-
| 1988  || Portlaoise || style="background-color:#FFD700"| Adamstown (Wexford) ||  || The Heath (Laois) || 
|-
| 1987  ||Clongeen || Adamstown (Wexford) ||  || Crettyard (Laois) || 
|-
| 1986 || Castletown Geoghegan || style="background-color:#FFD700"| The Heath (Laois) ||  || Rochfortbridge (Westmeath) || 
|-
| 1985 || Castlebridge || style="background-color:#FFD700"| The Heath (Laois) ||  || Shelmaliers (Wexford) || 
|-
| 1984 || Rochfortbridge || style="background-color:#C0C0C0"| The Heath (Laois) ||  || Rochfortbridge (Westmeath) || 
|-
| 1983 ||The Heath || style="background-color:#C0C0C0"| The Heath (Laois)  ||  || Rochfortbridge (Westmeath) || 
|-
| 1982 || Rochfortbridge || style="background-color:#C0C0C0"| Rochfortbridge (Westmeath)  ||  || Tullamore (Offaly) || 
|-
| 1981 ||Ballinamore, Offaly || Tullamore (Offaly) ||  || Rochfortbridge (Westmeath) ||
|-
| 1980 ||<small>O'Moore Park</small> || style="background-color:#C0C0C0"| Rochfortbridge (Westmeath)  ||  || Adamstown (Wexford) || 
|-
| 1979  || Portarlington || Crettyard (Laois) ||  || Rochfortbridge (Westmeath) || 
|-
| 1978  || Crettyard|| Crettyard (Laois) ||  || Rochfortbridge (Westmeath) ||
|-
| 1977  || -|| Crettyard (Laois) || colspan="4"| 
|}The Bill Daly cup states that the 1979 winners were The Heath but evidence elsewhere points to this not being the case.''

By Club

By County

References

Ladies' Gaelic football competitions
Ladies
1978 establishments in Ireland